Jimmy Nah((13 April 1967 – 4 January 2008), better known by his nickname "MC King", was a Singaporean comedian and actor. He died of heart and lung failure at the age of 40.

Early life and career
Nah entered the entertainment industry in 1990 after completing the SBC drama training course. He made his debut in a drama series titled Friends Next Door. He played a character who was perennially on leave, thus earning him his nickname. 

Nah also hosted Comedy Nite along with Jack Neo, Moses Lim and Mark Lee, and acted in a couple of local movies, including Jack Neo's I Not Stupid, Homerun and I Not Stupid Too, as well as a number of local drama serials.

Death
On the morning of 4 January 2008, Nah was rushed to hospital after he experienced breathing difficulties while at home near Old Airport Road. He died at around 13:00 hours at Tan Tock Seng Hospital at the age of 40. 

A MediaCorp report said its not known if the well-known actor had suffered from any health problems. In his last entry, he posted on his blog on New Year's Eve, he had wished for good health in the coming year and for the renewal of his MediaCorp contract. His death certificate stated the cause of death as heart and lung failure.

Nah was cremated on 6 January 2008, following a funeral. Actors present at the service included Patricia Mok, Rayson Tan, Henry Thia,  Lin Youfa, and Steven Woon. 

Nah is survived by his brother.

Filmography

Television programmes

Films

References

External links
 Nah's blog

1968 births
2008 deaths
Singaporean male television actors
Singaporean people of Teochew descent